Thomas Knyvett College is a medium sized mixed school with Academy Converter status (conversion to an Academy is underway during the 2014–2015 academic year) educating students aged 11–16 in Ashford, Surrey, England.  The college is part of the Howard Schools Trust which includes the Howard of Effingham School in Effingham in the county, the schools within which are supported by an Executive Headteacher, the prototype arrangement of its kind in the United Kingdom.

History
The seventeenth century politician, Thomas Knyvet, 1st Baron Knyvet (1545-1622) was granted the manor of Stanwell in 1603. On his death in 1622 he left provision for the founding of a school in Stanwell.

Funding
A non-fee paying school, Thomas Knyvett College's funding is received predominantly via pro rata Surrey County Council annual allocation.  Since 2009 the secondary education provider has been eligible for the Howard of Effingham Trust Fund and related donations, Charities Commission registered, funds which are raised by parents across the region and fundraising.  Funds are enhanced by successful registration or selection for pupil premiums and grants restricted to central and local government-funded schools. Free school meals eligibility: 22.4% (band: mid).

Attributes 
In the house system, each of the three houses which compete are divided into forms for many years.  The resultant tutor forms provide a pastoral, advice point across all activities.

The proportion of students known to be eligible for the pupil premium funding (additional government funding for children in the care of the local authority, students known to be eligible
for free school meals and those from service families) is slightly greater than average, standing for the financial year 2014-15 at £194,175.  The proportion of disabled students and those with special educational needs who are supported
at school action is above the national average. The proportion supported at school action plus or with a statement of special educational needs is below the national average.

Facilities
The main facilities are:
Astroturf sports fields
Sports fields and field sports athletics grounds
Main Hall
Dining Hall
Sports Hall
Sports Gym
Tennis Courts
Classrooms
ICT Suites
Library
Cookery Classrooms
Resistant Materials Classroom
Music Practice Rooms
Drama Studio

Ofsted 
The Ofsted inspection of December 2019 gave the school an overall Good, on the four-point scale (Outstanding/Good/Satisfactory/Inadequate).  Omitting praised examples, the headline assessment of teaching was:

Violent incident 2023
In February 2023 a video was widely circulated online showing several white girls violently attacking a black girl outside the school while being urged on by an adult woman.  Several bystanders were watching the child being violently assaulted, but did not intervene. The police subsequently made several arrests describing the matter as a "serious racially aggravated assault".. A protest was held at the school the next day with participants calling for an investigation and justice for the girl. The protests were led by anti-racism group Forever Family. Several Members of Parliament across parties weighed in, through a letter penned by Janet Daby, which called for a full investigation.  British rapper, Dave, and others also called for the firing of teachers.

References

External links
School website

Academies in Surrey
Borough of Spelthorne
Secondary schools in Surrey